Roy Harrigan is a former speaker of the House of Assembly of the British Virgin Islands.  He was elected to the position on 14 September 2007 following the 2007 general election and stepped down when the House was dissolved for the 2011 general election.

Political offices

See also
 List of speakers of the House of Assembly of the British Virgin Islands

References

Living people
Place of birth missing (living people)
Year of birth missing (living people)
Speakers of the House of Assembly of the British Virgin Islands
Members of the House of Assembly of the British Virgin Islands
British Virgin Islands politicians